Psolus phantapus, also known as the brown psolus, is a species of sea cucumber in the family Psolidae.

Description 

Psolus phantapus have cylindrically body arched at both ends to form a U shape. They grow up to 200 mm in length. They have a rectangular ventral sole at the base where tube feet concentrate. Their colour range from yellowish brown to dark brown and black.

Habitat 

Psolus phantapus are epifaunal and use the ventral sole to attach themselves. They are found at 4-500 m depth.

Diet 

They are deposit feeders. They have ten bushy orange tentacles that collect food from water.

Reproduction 

They reproduce sexually. Breeding season is February-march.

Distribution 

They are found in Arctic and Atlantic ocean.

References

External links
 

Dendrochirotida
Animals described in 1765